The eighth season of the American fictional drama television series ER first aired on September 27, 2001, and concluded on May 16, 2002.  The eighth season consists of 22 episodes.

Plot
After being gone for five years, Susan Lewis returns to the show providing continuity of the earlier years and some closure with Greene. Greene begins to experience health problems and deals with Rachel after she starts causing problems. In addition, Weaver also has a revelation and confronts and accepts her sexuality. The season's long story line of Greene's illness and death and how it affects many characters marks Season 8 as a major turning point in the series. This season also saw a major change in the cast, with four characters leaving, including original characters Greene and Benton as well as Cleo and Dave. Abby helps a neighbor, but faces repercussions and Kovac punches the man who clobbered Abby. In turn, two new main characters with very different personalities – Michael Gallant and Greg Pratt – are introduced in Season 8. For the first time, John Carter is centered as the main character of the show at the end of the season. In this season, several staff members face personal and professional pressures, including Greene and Corday who face the most difficult issue of all when their baby overdoses on Ecstasy pills. The two argue after their baby nearly dies. Weaver becomes more aggressive and she accepts that she is a lesbian. Greene's final episode as a regular character is the 21st episode of Season 8. Benton and Finch also leave to make new changes in their lives. After Greene's death, many of the characters become affected, especially Carter who reads two letters to the staff. A plague hits the ER as Season 8 ends. Several members attend Mark's funeral.

Cast
This season saw the final appearance on ER of series regulars Michael Michele and Erik Palladino, and the final appearances as a series regular for Anthony Edwards and Eriq La Salle.

Main cast
 Anthony Edwards as Dr. Mark Greene – Attending Physician
 Noah Wyle as Dr. John Carter – Chief Resident
 Laura Innes as Dr. Kerry Weaver – Chief of Emergency Medicine
 Alex Kingston as Dr. Elizabeth Corday – Associate Chief of Surgery
 Paul McCrane as Dr. Robert Romano – Chief of Staff and Surgery
 Goran Visnjic as Dr. Luka Kovač – Attending Physician
 Maura Tierney as Nurse Abby Lockhart
 Sherry Stringfield as Dr. Susan Lewis – Attending Physician (episodes 4–22)
 Michael Michele as Dr. Cleo Finch – Pediatric Emergency Medicine Fellow (episodes 1–10)
 Erik Palladino as Dr. Dave Malucci – Resident PGY-4 (episodes 1–4)
 Ming-Na as Dr. Jing-Mei Chen – Chief Resident
 Sharif Atkins as Lt. Michael Gallant – Third-year Medical Student (episodes 7–22)
 Eriq La Salle as Dr. Peter Benton – Surgical Attending Physician and Director of Diversity (episodes 1–10)

Supporting cast

Doctors and Medical students
 John Aylward as Dr. Donald Anspaugh – Surgical Attending Physician and Hospital Board Member
 Mekhi Phifer as Dr. Greg Pratt – ER Intern
 David Brisbin as Dr. Alexander Babcock – Anesthesiologist
 Iqbal Theba as Dr. Zagerby –  Ophthalmologist
 Matthew Glave as Dr. Dale Edson
 Perry Anzilotti as Dr. Ed – Anesthesiologist 
 Megan Cole as Dr. Alice Upton – Pathologist
 Christopher John Fields as Dr. Phil Tobiason
 Eddie Shin as Stanley Mao – Medical Student
 Dee Freeman	as Dr. Lutz

Nurses
 Ellen Crawford as Nurse Lydia Wright
Conni Marie Brazelton as Nurse Conni Oligario
 Deezer D as Nurse Malik McGrath
 Laura Cerón as Nurse Chuny Marquez
 Yvette Freeman as Nurse Manager Haleh Adams
 Lily Mariye as Nurse Lily Jarvik
 Gedde Watanabe as Nurse Yosh Takata
 Dinah Lenney as Nurse Shirley
 Bellina Logan as Nurse Kit
 Kyle Richards as Nurse Dori
 Nadia Shazana as Nurse Jacy
 Lucy Rodriguez as Nurse Bjerke
 Elizabeth Rodriguez as Nurse Sandra
 Linda Shing as ICU Nurse Corazon

Staff, Paramedics and Officers
 Abraham Benrubi as Desk Clerk Jerry Markovic
 Troy Evans as Desk Clerk Frank Martin
 Kristin Minter as Desk Clerk Miranda "Randi" Fronczak
 Pamela Sinha as Desk Clerk Amira
 Julie Delpy as ER Aide Nicole
 Erica Gimpel as Social Worker Adele Newman
 Skip Stellrecht as Chaplain Miller
Emily Wagner as Paramedic Doris Pickman
 Montae Russell as Paramedic Dwight Zadro
Lynn A. Henderson as Paramedic Pamela Olbes
 Demetrius Navarro as Paramedic Morales
Brian Lester as Paramedic Brian Dumar
Michelle Bonilla as Paramedic Christine Harms
 Ed Lauter as Fire Captain Dannaker
 Julie Ann Emery as Paramedic Niki Lumley
 Chad McKnight as Officer Wilson
 David Roberson as Officer Durcy

Family
 Frances Sternhagen as Grandma Millicent "Gamma" Carter
 Michael Gross as Mr. John "Jack" Carter
 Mary McDonnell as Mrs. Eleanor Carter
 Christine Harnos as Jennifer Simon
 Hallee Hirsh as Rachel Greene
 Lisa Vidal as Sandy Lopez
 Khandi Alexander as Jackie Robbins
 Tamala Jones as Joanie Robbins
 Vondie Curtis Hall as Roger McGrath
Matthew Watkins as Reese Benton
 Kathleen Wilhoite as Chloe Lewis
 Sally Field as Maggie Wyczenski (uncredited voice)
 Mark Valley as Richard Lockhart

Notable guest stars

 Kal Penn as Narajan
 David Hewlett as Mr. Schudy
 Vernée Watson Johnson as April Wilson
 Roma Maffia as Ms. Janice Prager
 David Krumholtz as Paul Sobriki
 Liza Weil as Samantha Sobriki
 Christina Hendricks as Joyce Westlake
 Matthew Settle as Brian Westlake
 Chris Sarandon as Dr. Burke (NYC)
 Michael Ironside as Dr. William "Wild Willy" Swift
 Paul Hipp as Craig Turner
 Amy Carlson as FDNY Paramedic Alex Taylor
 Molly Price as NYPD Officer Faith Yokas
 Kim Raver as FDNY Paramedic Kim Zambrano
 Jason Wiles as NYPD Officer Bosco Boscorelli
 Joe Lisi as NYPD Lieutenant Bob Swersky
 Dana Elcar as Many, a blind patient
 Bellamy Young as Grace
 Keegan-Michael Key as Witowski
 Lori Petty as Shane
 Chris Burke as George

Production
Original executive producers John Wells and Michael Crichton reprised their roles. Seventh season executive producer Jack Orman returned as executive producer and show runner. Previous executive producer Christopher Chulack remained a consulting producer while working on Wells' Third Watch. Seventh season co-executive producer Meredith Stiehm also served as a consulting producer for the eighth season but left the crew with the close of the season. Seventh season supervising producers R. Scott Gemmill and Dee Johnson were promoted to co-executive producers for the eighth season. Seventh season producers Richard Thorpe, Joe Sachs, Jonathan Kaplan, and Wendy Spence Rosato all returned for the eighth season. Sachs was promoted to supervising producer mid-season. Michael Salamunovich returned as co-producer but left the crew with the close of the season.

Wells wrote a further two episodes for the season. Orman was the seasons prolific writer with six episodes. Gemmill wrote five episodes. Sachs wrote three episodes. Johnson wrote four episodes. Stiehm wrote three episodes. David Zabel joined the crew as executive story editor and contributed to four episodes as a writer. Writer Elizabeth Hunter became a story editor for the second half of the season only and wrote two further episodes. 

Producers Kaplan and Thorpe served as the season's regular directors. Kaplan helmed five episodes while Thorpe directed four. New directors Nelson McCormick and actor Vondie Curtis-Hall each directed two episodes. Cast member and regular director Laura Innes helmed a further episode. Series veterans Félix Enríquez Alcalá, Christopher Misiano, David Nutter, and Tom Moore all returned to direct further episodes. Show runner Orman made his television directing debut with an episode. The season's other new directors were Alan J. Levi, Jessica Yu, and Jesús S. Treviño.

Episodes

Notes

References

External links 
 

2001 American television seasons
2002 American television seasons
ER (TV series) seasons